The 1988 Nabisco Dinah Shore was a women's professional golf tournament, held March 31 to April 3 at Mission Hills Country Club in Rancho Mirage, California. This was the 17th edition of the Nabisco Dinah Shore, and the sixth as a major championship.

Amy Alcott won the second of her three Dinah Shores, two strokes ahead of runner-up Colleen Walker. With consecutive scores of 66 on Friday and Saturday, she entered the final round with a four-stroke lead.

Alcott and caddy Bill Kurre started the tradition of jumping into "Poppie's Pond" upon  After her third win 1991, they repeated the plunge, including tournament host  It was not fully embraced by others until 1994, when Donna Andrews made the leap, followed by Nanci Bowen the next year, and it became an annual

Past champions in the field

Made the cut

Missed the cut

Final leaderboard
Sunday, April 3, 1988

(a) - denotes amateur

References

External links
Golf Observer leaderboard

Chevron Championship
Golf in California
Nabisco Dinah Shore
Nabisco Dinah Shore
Nabisco Dinah Shore
Nabisco Dinah Shore
Nabisco Dinah Shore
Women's sports in California